Sunita Prasad is a Canadian actress. She has appeared in television series such as iZombie, Bates Motel and UnREAL and also voiced Alicia Masters in Fantastic Four: World's Greatest Heroes.  She has had recurring roles in several Hallmark Movies & Mysteries films, including Picture Perfect Mysteries and Martha's Vineyard Mysteries.

Filmography

Film

Television

References 

Year of birth missing (living people)
Living people
Canadian television actresses
Canadian voice actresses
Canadian actresses of Indian descent